The Shire of Croydon is a local government area in western Queensland, Australia. The council consists of a mayor plus four councillors, each of whom represents the entire Shire.

History

The area was originally settled as part of a gold rush in the 1880s, and at one time had a population of 7,000. The Croydon Division was created on 31 December 1887 under the Divisional Boards Act 1887.

With the passage of the Local Authorities Act 1902, the Croydon Division became the Shire of Croydon 31 March 1903.

At one stage the Town of Croydon was responsible for the town itself; however, this was dissolved into the Shire on 1 January 1909.

Amalgamation
Croydon, like many western local government areas, was not affected by amalgamations in 2007–2008, mainly because of the large geographical size and remoteness of the shire. Despite being rated as "weak" by the Financial Sustainability Review, analysis by the Local Government Commissioners revealed this to be due to factors upon which amalgamation would have no effect.

Towns and localities
The Shire of Croydon includes the following settlements:

 Croydon
 Blackbull

Libraries 
Croydon Shire Council operates a public library at Croydon.

Population

Chairmen and mayors
Chairmen
 1892: E.S. Ross 
 1927: William M. O'Flaherty

Mayors
 2008–2012: Cornelia Bernardina (Corrie) Pickering 
 2012–present: Trevor Joseph Pickering

References

External links

 Croydon Shire Council (official site)
 University of Queensland: Queensland Places: Croydon and Croydon Shire
 Croydon's listing on Queensland LG database

 
Local government areas of Queensland
Australian gold rushes
1887 establishments in Australia
North West Queensland